Stefanos Stroungis (born 9 October 1997) is a Greek professional footballer who plays as a centre-back for Super League club Atromitos.

References

1997 births
Living people
Greek footballers
Greece youth international footballers
Atromitos F.C. players
Super League Greece players
Association football defenders
Footballers from Volos